The Devil Conspiracy is a 2022 science fiction horror film written and produced by Ed Alan and directed by Nathan Frankowski. It stars Alice Orr-Ewing, Joe Doyle, Eveline Hall, Peter Mensah, Joe Anderson, Spencer Wilding, Brian Caspe and James Faulkner.

Filmed in the Czech Republic it was released at the Brussels International Fantastic Film Festival on September 10, 2022, and in theaters on January 13, 2023. The film received generally negative reviews from critics.

Plot
  

At the beginning of time, Lucifer leads a rebellion of fallen angels against God. The war ends with God casting down Lucifer & his fallen into Hell. Michael, the Archangel of Justice, travels to Hell to imprison his brother forever. Lucifer begs Michael to side with him, to which he denies before Departing. 

In modern times, the world witnesses the new display of the Shroud of Turin in an exhibit. Lauren Milton pursues writing a thesis based on her opinion of good & evil. Father Marconi, a friend of Lauren, gains her access to the Shroud's entrance, and Marconi details the battle of the angels with a statue of Michael defeating Lucifer. Lauren is skeptical but she stays to draw images of the art. 

Meanwhile, Doctor Laurent showcases his biotech firm in the research in genetic cloning, explaining to investors that with their support they are able to resurrect past geniuses such as Michelangelo, DaVinci, & many more. However, secretly the company is a cult who wish to break Lucifer and his demons out of Hell to avenge the rebellion. The cults leader, the sinister Liz, sneaks into the Shroud of Turin exhibit and kills a guard and uses his head to deactivate the Shroud's security system. Marconi witnesses this and runs to stop her. Lauren hides in a confession booth and witnesses Liz stab Marconi through the chest. Liz recovers the Shroud and her men find Lauren and take her. Before Marconi dies, he asks Michael to use his body to stop them. Michael possesses Marconi's body and travels out of the city. 

Michael finds a Scholar who holds him at gunpoint before realizing he is the Archangel. The Scholar expresses to Michael the prophecy of the wicked woman and a beast of the Earth are to bring a child into the world who will be Lucifer's vessel. Michael realizes this is why they stole the Shroud, as a normal human body would not suffice, but with the DNA of Jesus Christ, they could clone him to bring the End of the World. Lucifer is shown when a tremor breaks the rock he is sealed to. He then breaks his chains and frees himself.

Lauren is brought to the cult's facility along with three other girls; Sophia, Brenda and Mia. Brenda keeps panicking and the others try to calm her. Medical staff gather the blood from each girl before leaving. The women plan to escape by Mia pretending to be dead. When the research team enter again, they attack but fail as more men arrive. Lauren & Sophia are brought to the castle's square, being dressed in wedding gowns with the cult members watching. They are chained and the beast of the Earth enters and grabs both women to depart down a chasm which is the entrance way between Earth and Hell. Demons grab both of them and the spirit of Lucifer enters Sophia but because she is inadequate kills her. Lucifer then enters Lauren and is a perfect match. 

Michael enters the facility and sneaks in killing the guards and breaking Lauren out to escape. Sneaking through the undercarriage of the facility, they encounter the Beast and Lauren is retrieved by cult guards while Michael escapes through the portal to Hell. He encounters Mammon and three other fallen angels who explain that Michael is now trapped and that the cult will prevail with bringing Hell on Earth. They leave and He is approached by humans who were trapped as previous sacrifices that were not successful. He asks them to find his sword which holds his Heavenly. Minor demons attack and chase them off while looking. 

Liz tells Lauren of Lucifer's folly and why he was justified in turning against God and that her sacrifice will be the most glorious to humankind, who Lucifer agrees to have co-lead. It is revealed Lauren lost a child at birth and angry at Liz's torment of her and the justification of this denies her willingness. Lucifer temps Lauren into killing Liz and having her join him. She agrees and storms out with Lucifer's possession. After stomping a guards head in anger, she relents and tries killing the child against Lucifer with bleach. Liz & Laurent arrive with Lucifer possessing Lauren to stop her from doing this. Meanwhile The children find Michael's sword and before Mammon and his fallen angels arrive to stop them, Michael gains his angelic powers and kills one of the fallen before they retreat. He promises to return to rescue them after he is done and flies to Earth. 

Michael repossessed Marconi's body and heads back to the facility. He tries to help Lauren but she is still possessed by Lucifer who stabs him in the neck. lucifer exhibits the mentality he has of using humanity to destroy the world but Michael details that this was God's plan all along and that the child was to destroy Lucifer. Lucifer in anger, runs away and begs Liz to kill the child out of fear, but Liz denies this and goes with the plan. Lauren gives birth to a healthy baby boy, and Liz takes him away to the square, having the Beast dispose of Lauren in Hell's portal. Liz walks into the square with all the cult members bowing before Him. Liz states that unlike the Holy baptism of water, the Child must be baptised in blood, and the beast begins hacking and killing all the cult members to hide the truth of what occurred. Laurent holds the child kissing it, before Liz orders the beast to kill him as well. 

Michael saves Lauren and the two attack Liz saving the child, to which Michael tells Liz the truth. She denies it and Lauren drives away with the child with Michael going to the portal to close it. Thousands of Fallen Angels and demons make for the portal and Michael closes it, but is attacked and the Beast re-opens it. Michael them arms detonators and destroys the portal, killing the beast and destroying the facility. The Scholar notices this and rejoices. 

Lauren and the Scholar bring the child to the Vatican who display the Shroud and pronounce the prophecy. Michael returns to Hell and frees the children as promised. He then narrates that the world is saved and asks God to protect the child, who has grown to a young age. Liz sees him in the forest and whispers "Lucifer" to which the child shows Lucifer's mist upon his nose, meaning the battle is far from over.

Cast
 Alice Orr-Ewing as Laura Milton
 Joe Doyle as Father Michael Marconi 
 Eveline Hall as Liz
 Peter Mensah as Archangel Michael
 Joe Anderson as Lucifer
 Spencer Wilding as Beast of the Ground
 Brian Caspe as Dr. Laurent
 James Faulkner as Cardinal Vincini
 Victoria Chilap as Brenda
 Wendy Rosas as Sophia

Production
Principal photography took place in Prague and other Czech Republic locations from March to April 2019 under the tile, dEvil.

Release and box office
The Devil Conspiracy was released at the Brussels International Fantastic Film Festival on September 10, 2022. It was released  theatrically on January 13, 2023, in the United States and Canada.  It grossed $765,218 in the United States and Canada and $199,300 in Russia for a worldwide total of $964,518.

Critical reception
Review aggregator website Rotten Tomatoes reported an approval rating of 27% based on 22 reviews.

Dennis Harvey writing for Variety said "If they're game for CGI-laden eye candy that treats Biblical prophesies with about as much respectful seriousness as the National Treasure franchise did American history, they’ll be rewarded with a lively if overstuffed popcorn diversion".  Describing it as a mashup of The Da Vinci Code and Rosemary's Baby, he praised Frankowski's "colorful stylistic" direction but called Alan's script "jumbled".  Matt Donato from IGN gave the film a score of six out of ten, saying The Devil Conspiracy is a high-concept religious action flick with horror influences that sells its ambitions short but still entertains despite itself".

References

External links
 
 
 
 
 

2020s English-language films
2020s Italian-language films
American science fiction horror films
Czech science fiction horror films
Samuel Goldwyn Films films
Films shot in Prague
Films set in Prague
Films shot in the Czech Republic
Films set in the Czech Republic
Films about religion